The Great Flirtation is a 1934 American pre-Code comedy drama film directed by Ralph Murphy and starring Elissa Landi, Adolphe Menjou, David Manners and Lynne Overman. The film was released on June 15, 1934 by Paramount Pictures. It was based on an unpublished story I Love an Actress by Gregory Ratoff and adapted by Humphrey Pearson.

Synopsis
In Budapest Stephan Karpath is an egotistical but celebrated stage actor, whose lover Zita Marishka is an aspiring actress. When she is cast alongside him in a play he jealously has her fired. In a huff she departs for New York City, but he accompanies her and they are married on the ship going over. However, in American nobody has heard of Stephan and he finds it difficult to find work. His wife hits on the idea of passing herself off as a famous, but unmarried, Russian actress and is cast in the lead of a Broadway play. She manages to get Stephan work playing opposite her, but to his chagrin she is pursued romantically by several men including the producer and the playwright Larry Kenyon. When it dawns on Stephan that she really loves Larry, in whose work she has become a great actress, he pretends to return to Budapest but really goes to North Dakota.

Cast 
Elissa Landi as Zita Marishka
Adolphe Menjou as Stephan Karpath
David Manners as Larry Kenyon
Lynne Overman as Joe Lang
Raymond Walburn as Henry Morgan
Adrian Rosley as Mikos
Paul Porcasi as Herr Direktor
George Baxter as Arpad
Judith Vosselli as Queen in Play
Akim Tamiroff as Paul Wengler
Vernon Steele as Bigelow

References

Bibliography
 Dooley, Roger. From Scarface to Scarlett: American Films in the 1930s. Harcourt Brace Jovanovich, 1984.

External links
 

1934 films
American comedy-drama films
1934 comedy films
1934 comedy-drama films
1934 drama films
Paramount Pictures films
Films directed by Ralph Murphy
American black-and-white films
1930s English-language films
1930s American films
Films set in Budapest
Films set in New York City
Films about theatre